Bibb v. Navajo Freight Lines, Inc., 359 U.S. 520 (1959), is a United States Supreme Court case in which the Court held that the Illinois law requiring trucks to have unique mudguards was unconstitutional under the Commerce clause.

Background 
The state of Illinois enacted a statute requiring curved mud guards, instead of straight mudflaps on trucks driven in Illinois. Although there was no federal regulation requiring mudflaps or mudguards, Arkansas required straight mudflaps, which were legal in at least 45 states.  The Illinois legislature asserted that the unique curved mudguards would be more useful in preventing stones and other debris to be kicked up from the back of trucks, thus preventing more accidents than other types of mudflaps. The plaintiffs were trucking companies who drove through Illinois and would have to use one form of mudflap equipment while in Illinois, but other mudflap equipment while in other states. The named plaintiff was Navajo Freight Lines, Inc., of New Mexico.

The only issue was whether in the absence of federal regulation, in this context did the Commerce Clause allow one State to prescribe standards that would affect interstate carriers in a way that would conflict with the standards of another State.

Opinion of the Court 
The Supreme Court held that the Illinois law was unconstitutional under the Commerce clause, technically the Dormant Commerce Clause.

In Bibb v. Navajo Freight Lines, 359 U.S. 520, 524 (1959), the Supreme Court stated:

The court was unanimous, but Justice Harlan filed a concurrence, which was joined by Justice Stewart. To find the statute unconstitutional, the Court balanced the benefit of the regulation to the state (in the form of increased safety) against the burden on interstate commerce arising from out of state truck drivers having to stop at the Illinois border and change mudguards. Because the benefit to Illinois was small and the burden on interstate commerce large, the Court held that

Subsequent developments 
It is considered one of the leading precedents on the law of Interstate commerce.

See also 
 Kassel v. Consolidated Freightways Corp.: 1981 U.S. Supreme Court case applying the Dormant Commerce Clause to interstate trucking safety regulations
 List of United States Supreme Court cases, volume 359

References

External links
 

United States Constitution Article One case law
United States Supreme Court cases
United States Dormant Commerce Clause case law
1959 in United States case law
Legal history of Illinois
Vehicle law
Trucking industry in the United States
United States Supreme Court cases of the Warren Court
Automotive accessories